Austria has participated in every edition of the World Athletics Championships since the inaugural event in 1983. Austria is 82nd on the all time medal table.

Medalists

Medal tables

By championships

By event

By gender

See also
 Austria at the Olympics

References

Nations at the World Athletics Championships
World Championships